Dennis Robert Tipping (born 20 September 1939) is an Australian former sprinter who competed in the 1960 Summer Olympics.

References

1939 births
Living people
Australian male sprinters
Olympic athletes of Australia
Athletes (track and field) at the 1960 Summer Olympics